The following is an incomplete list of films set or shot primarily in Dunedin, New Zealand.

 The Royal Treatment (2022) (partly filmed in Dunedin)
 The Power of the Dog (2021) (partly filmed in Dunedin)
 Black Christmas (2019) (partly filmed in Dunedin)
 The Light Between Oceans (2014) (partly filmed in Dunedin and Port Chalmers)
 I Survived A Zombie Holocaust (2012) (filmed in Dunedin)
 Paradise at the End of the World (Out of Ashes) (2009) (filmed on Otago Peninsula, Dunedin)
 X-Men Origins: Wolverine  (partly filmed in Dunedin)
 Perfect Creature (2007) (filmed in Dunedin)
 Out of the Blue (2006) (set in Aramoana, Dunedin; filmed at Aramoana and Long Beach, Dunedin)
 Sylvia (2003) (filmed in Dunedin)
 Jaal: The Trap (2003) (partly filmed in Dunedin)
 Scarfies (1999) (filmed and set in Dunedin)
 The Grasscutter (1990) (filmed and set in Dunedin)
 An Angel at My Table (1990) (filmed and set partially in Dunedin)
 Pictures (1981) (filmed and set in Dunedin)
 Phar Lap's Son (1936)  (filmed in Dunedin)

References

External links 
 https://www.imdb.com/search/title?locations=Dunedin

Culture in Dunedin
Dunedin
Dunedin
Dunedin
Mass media in Dunedin
 Dunedin
 Dunedin